"Fly by Night" is a song written by Ritchie Adams and Neval Nader and performed by Andy Williams.  The song reached #20 on the U.S. adult contemporary chart and #82 on the Billboard chart in 1961.  The song was the B-side to the song "Danny Boy."

References

1961 singles
Andy Williams songs
Columbia Records singles
1961 songs
Songs written by Ritchie Adams